Schafer State Park is a public recreation area straddling the Satsop River midway between Olympia and Aberdeen in the Satsop Hills of Mason County, Washington. The  state park offers camping, two miles of hiking trails, fishing (especially for steelhead), swimming, birdwatching, interpretive activities, wildlife viewing, and horseshoes. The park's abundance of historic structures led to its being added to the National Register of Historic Places in 2010.

References

External links

Schafer State Park Washington State Parks and Recreation Commission 
Schafer State Park Map Washington State Parks and Recreation Commission

State parks of Washington (state)
Parks in Mason County, Washington
National Register of Historic Places in Mason County, Washington
Protected areas established in 1924
Works Progress Administration in Washington (state)
National Park Service rustic in Washington (state)